The Battle of Karánsebes was a friendly fire incident in the Austrian army, supposedly occurring during the night of 21–22 September 1788, during the Austro-Turkish War of 1787–1791.

Events
Different portions of an Austrian army, which were scouting for forces of the Ottoman Empire, fired on one another by mistake, causing self-inflicted casualties and severely disrupting the Austrian baggage train, during the night of 21–22 September 1788. The Ottomans took advantage and captured the city of Karánsebes (now Caransebeș, Romania):

Other sources include one from 1843, 60 years after the battle. This made some scholars felt difficulty to draw reliable source and evidence for the detailed account of the battle.

The army of Austria, approximately 100,000 strong, was setting up camp around the town. The army's vanguard, a contingent of hussars, crossed the Timiș River to scout for the presence of the Ottoman army. There was no sign of the Ottoman forces, but the hussars came across a group of Romanian people, who offered to sell schnapps to the weary soldiers.

Soon afterwards, some infantry crossed the river. When they saw the party going on, the infantrymen demanded alcohol for themselves. The hussars refused to give them any of the schnapps and, still drunk, set up makeshift fortifications around the barrels. A heated argument ensued, and one soldier fired a shot. 

Immediately, the hussars and infantry engaged in combat with one another. During the conflict, some Romanian infantry began shouting, "Turcii! Turcii!" ("Turks! Turks!"). The hussars fled the scene, thinking that the Ottoman army's attack was imminent. Most of the infantry also ran away; the army comprised Austrians, Romanians, Serbs from the military frontier, Croats, and Italians from Lombardy, as well as other minorities, many of whom could not understand one another. While it is not clear which one of these groups did so, they gave the false warning without telling the others, who promptly fled. The situation was made worse when officers, in an attempt to restore order, shouted, "Halt! Halt!" which was misheard by soldiers with no knowledge of German as "Allah! Allah!".

As the hussars fled through the camps, a corps commander, General of Artillery Colloredo, thought that it was a cavalry charge by the Ottoman army and ordered artillery fire. Meanwhile, the entire camp awoke to the sound of battle. The panic caused by the incident demoralised the Holy Roman Emperor Joseph II to the point that he ordered the army to withdraw.

Two days later, the Ottoman army arrived. They discovered dead and wounded soldiers and easily took Karánsebes.

Losses 
In determining losses, accounts of this incident do not distinguish between losses that were caused by friendly fire, those that were caused by the Turks, and those that resulted from pillaging by the Austrians or by the local Wallachians. One account states that the Austrian rear guard suffered 150 casualties. Another source claims that 538 men, 24 jäger, and one officer went missing after the incident, but most returned to duty. Also lost were 3 cannons and the chest containing the army's payroll.

In his account of the incident, Paul Bernard, author of a 1968 biography of the Holy Roman Emperor Joseph II, made an uncited claim that the friendly fire incident caused 10,000 casualties. Neither the Austrian war archives' records nor those who have examined them corroborate Bernard's claim. Bernard's account of the war has been dismissed as inaccurate. Nevertheless, Bernard's claim of 10,000 casualties was repeated by Geoffrey Regan.

Although tens of thousands of casualties occurred within the Austrians' ranks during the course of the 1787 campaign against the Turks, the vast majority of the casualties were the result of disease, particularly malaria and dysentery.

Published sources
Contemporary sources that attest to the incident include:
  "Zur Kriegsgeschichte" (On the history of the war), Real Zeitung (Erlangen, Bavaria, (Germany)), 7 October 1788, no. 80, pp. 723–729; see especially pp. 726–728. (in German)
  "Aus dem Feldlager der Hauptarmee, bey Sakul, vom 23. Septr." (From the encampment of the main army, near Sacu, 23 September), Bayreuther Zeitungen (Bayreuth, Bavaria, (Germany)), no. 120, pp. 847–848 (7 October 1788).  (in German)
  "VI.  Türkische Angriffe auf das Kaiserliche Lager.  Action bey Slatina.  Rückzug der Kaiserlichen Armee.  Einnahme der Festung Choczim. Anderweitige Begebenheiten des Türkenkriegs." (VI.  Turkish attacks against the Emperor's camp.  Action near Slatina.  Retreat of the Emperor's army.  Taking of the fortress at Khotyn.  Other events of the Turkish war.), Politisches Journal: nebst Anzeige von gelehrten und andern Sachen (Political Journal, including notices of scholarly and other works), 2 :  1052–1070 (1788); see especially pp. 1058–1059. (in German)
  "Foreign Intelligence," The European Magazine and London Review, 14 : 308 (October 1788).
  "Du Quartier-Général de l’Armée principale, près de Sakul, le 23. Septembre." (From the encampment of the main army, near Sacu, 23 September), Supplement aux Nouvelles Extraordinaires de Divers Endroits [Supplement to:  Extraordinary News from Various Places] (Leiden, Netherlands), no. 83, (14 October 1788).  (in French)
  "Da Trieste 3. Ottobre.  N.LVIII Supplemento Straodinario della Gazzetta di Vienna del 1. Ottobre" (From Trieste 3 October.  no. 58 Special supplement to the Vienna Newspaper of 1 October),  Notizie del mondo (Florence and Venice, (Italy)), no. 82, p. 654 (11 October 1788).  (in Italian)

The incident was subsequently recounted in: 
  "III. Geschichte des Feldzugs 1788 der k.k. Hauptarmee gegen die Türken (Fortsetzung)" (III.  History of the 1788 campaign of the imperial main army against the Turks (continuation)), Oestreichische militärische Zeitschrift (Austrian military journal), 4 :  58–70 (1831); see especially pp. 58–65. (in German)
  Criste, Oskar, Kriege unter Kaiser Josef II.  Nach den Feldakten und anderen authentischen Quellen bearbeitet in der kriegsgeschichtlichen Abteilung des k. und k. Kriegsarchivs [Wars under Emperor Joseph II.  According to the campaign documents and other authentic sources, edited in the War History Department of the Imperial and Royal War Archives] (Vienna, Austria:  L. W. Seidel & Sohn, 1904),"IX.  Rückzug des kaiserlichen Heeres nach Lugos, September 1788." (IX.  Retreat of the imperial army to Lugoj, September 1788.), pp. 301–308.  (in German)

The incident was also discussed in a master's thesis and in a doctoral thesis:

 Mayer, Matthew Z., "Joseph II and the campaign of 1788 against the Ottoman Turks," Master's thesis:  McGill University (Montreal, Quebec, Canada), 1997; see especially pp. 61–62.  Available at:  McGill University (Montreal, Quebec, Canada)
 Gramm, Ernst Rainer, "Der unglückliche Mack:  Aufsteig und Fall des Karl Mack von Leiberich" (The misfortunate Mack:  Rise and fall of Karl Mack von Leiberich), Doctoral thesis:  Vienna University, 2008; see especially pp. 82–84. (in German) Available at:  University of Vienna, Austria

The incident is also mentioned in:
  Schlosser, F.C. with Davison, D., trans., History of the Eighteenth Century and of the Nineteenth Century till the Overthrow of the French Empire. ... (London, England:  Chapman and Hall, 1845), vol. 6, p. 162.
  Gross-Hoffinger, Anton Johann, Geschichte Josephs des Zweiten [History of Joseph the Second] (Leipzig, (Germany):  Carl B. Lorck, 1847), pp. 292–294. (in German)

See also
Gideon, who led the Israelites to cause a similar friendly-fire incident in the Midianites camp, according to the Book of Judges.
List of friendly fire incidents

References

Bibliography
 Relevant excerpt on Google Books.
  Relevant excerpt on Google Books.

Urban legends
Conflicts in 1788
History of Banat
Friendly fire incidents
1788 in the Habsburg monarchy
Austro-Turkish Wars
1788 in the Ottoman Empire
Caransebeș